Mike Collins (born May 25, 1990) is an American professional ice hockey player who is currently an unrestricted free agent. He most recently played for ERC Ingolstadt in the Deutsche Eishockey Liga (DEL).

Playing career
Collins played collegiate hockey with the Merrimack Warriors in the NCAA Men's Division I Hockey East conference. In his junior year, Collins' outstanding play was rewarded with a selection to the 2012-13 All-Hockey East First Team.

After making his professional debut in the American Hockey League with the Providence Bruins and the Iowa Wild, Collins signed abroad in Germany with DEL2 club, EC Kassel Huskies on July 31, 2014. In the 2014–15 season, Collins impressed with the Huskies, scoring at a dominant level with 81 points in just 51 games to lead the club to a third-place finish in the regular season.

On June 1, 2015, Collins attracted the interest of the DEL, the German top flight, signing a one-year contract with the Krefeld Pinguine. He then had his contract renewed for the 2016-17 campaign. Collins left Krefeld at the conclusion of his two-year stint and was signed by fellow DEL outfit ERC Ingolstadt in June 2017.

Awards and honors

References

External links 

1990 births
Living people
ERC Ingolstadt players
Iowa Wild players
Kassel Huskies players
Krefeld Pinguine players
Merrimack Warriors men's ice hockey players
Providence Bruins players
Vernon Vipers players
American men's ice hockey forwards
AHCA Division I men's ice hockey All-Americans